2020 South American Indoor Championships in Athletics was the inaugural edition of the biennial indoor athletics competition between South American nations. The event was held in Cochabamba, Bolivia, on 1 and 2 February at the Estadio de Atletismo del Gobierno Autónomo Municipal de Cochabamba.

Medal summary

Men

Women

Medal table

Participation
Eleven member federations of CONSUDATLE participated in the championships.

See also
2019 South American Championships in Athletics
Athletics at the 2019 Pan American Games
2020 South American U23 Championships in Athletics
2020 Ibero-American Championships in Athletics
Athletics at the 2020 Summer Olympics

References

External links

Results
Day 1 Morning results
Day 1 Evening results
Day 2 results

2020
International athletics competitions hosted by Bolivia
Sport in Cochabamba
South American Championships in Athletics
South American Championships in Athletics
Athletics Championships
South American Championships in Athletics